The 1975 edition of the Copa América football tournament was played between 17 July and 28 October. For the first time there was no fixed venue, and all matches were played throughout the year in each country. In addition, the tournament changed its name from South American Championship to Copa América. All ten CONMEBOL countries participated, with defending champions Uruguay receiving a bye into the semi-finals and the rest starting in the group stage.

Squads
For a complete list of participating squads: see 1975 Copa América squads

Group stage
The teams were drawn into three groups, consisting of three teams each. Each team played twice (home and away) against the other teams in their group, with two points for a win, one point for a draw, and no points for a loss. The winner of each group advanced to the semi-finals.

Group A

Group B

Group C

{{center|''Match abandoned at 43}}

Knockout stage

Semi-finals

2–2 on points. Colombia won 3–1 on aggregate goals.

2–2 on points. Peru won on a drawing of lots.

Finals

2–2 on points. A play-off was played on a neutral ground to determine the winner.

Peru won the play-off 1–0.

Result

Goal scorers
With four goals, Leopoldo Luque and Ernesto Díaz are the top scorers in the tournament. In total, 79 goals were scored by 42 different players, with only one of them credited as own goal.4 goals  Leopoldo Luque
  Ernesto Díaz3 goals  Mario Kempes
  Daniel Killer
  Ovidio Mezza
  Danival
  Nelinho
  Palhinha
  Roberto Batata
  Juan Carlos Oblitas
  Oswaldo Ramírez2 goals  Osvaldo Ardiles
  Mario Zanabria
  Campos
  Luis Araneda
  Miguel Ángel Gamboa
  Ponciano Castro
  Willington Ortiz
  Gonzalo Castañeda
  Hugo Enrique Kiese
  Clemente Rolón
  Enrique Casaretto
  Teófilo Cubillas
  Percy Rojas1 goal  Julio Asad
  Ramón Bóveda
  Américo Gallego
  Romeu
  Sergio Ahumada
  Julio Crisosto
  Carlos Reinoso
  Edgar Angulo
  Oswaldo Calero
  Eduardo Retat
  Polo Carrera
  Félix Lasso
  Carlos Báez
  César Cueto
  Hugo Sotil
  Fernando Morena
  Ramón IriarteOwn goal'''
  Julio Meléndez (for Brazil)

References

External links
 Copa América 1975 at RSSSF

 
Copa América tournaments
1975 in South American football